Kadavur is a former state assembly constituency in Karur district, Tamil Nadu, India. It existed from 1967 to 1971.

Members of Legislative Assembly

Election results

1971

1967

References

External links
 

Karur district
Former assembly constituencies of Tamil Nadu